CIDI-FM is an English language community radio station with French programming that broadcasts at 99.1 FM in Brome Lake, Quebec, Canada.

Owned by Radio communautaire Missisquoi, a non-profit organization, the station was licensed in 2003.

References

External links
CIDI-FM history - Canadian Communication Foundation

CIDI Facebook Page

Idi
Idi
Idi
Radio stations established in 2003
2003 establishments in Quebec
Brome-Missisquoi Regional County Municipality